is a Japanese astronomer and discoverer of minor planets from Sapporo, in the northernmost prefecture of Japan.

Kaneda ranks among the world's most prolific individual discoverers of minor planets. He is credited by the Minor Planet Center with the co-discovery of 705 numbered minor planets, between 1987 and 2000, all of them in collaboration with astronomer Seiji Ueda. Along with being an astronomer, Kaneda works as a computer programmer and is a developer of astronomical software.

The main-belt asteroid 4677 Hiroshi, discovered by Atsushi Takahashi and Kazurō Watanabe at Kitami in 1990, is named after him.

List of discovered minor planets 

His many minor planet discoveries include (5646) 1990 TR, a near-Earth object of the Amor group, an asteroid from the main-belt, (5407) 1992 AX, a Mars-crossing asteroid, (7352) 1994 CO, a Jupiter trojan, as well as the three named main-belt asteroids 4672 Takuboku, 5176 Yoichi and 6235 Burney (the latter was not named by him). As of 2016, most of his numbered discoveries remain unnamed (see table below). All minor planets were co-discovered with Seiji Ueda.

References 
 

1953 births
Discoverers of asteroids

20th-century Japanese astronomers
Living people
Planetary scientists